Alida—a tug built in 1905 at Wilmington, Del., by Pusey & Jones Corp.—was apparently acquired by the Navy sometime in 1912. She was placed in service at Melville Station, RI, and spent her entire career there providing support for the Naval Torpedo Station, Newport, RI She served the Navy through World War I and into the twenties. In the summer of 1920, when the Navy adopted its present alphanumeric system of hull designations, Alida became YT-102. She was sold on 19 March 1921.

References
 

Ships built by Pusey and Jones
1905 ships
Tugs of the United States Navy